Frederick II, Duke of Holstein-Gottorp (21 April 1568 – 15 June 1587) was a Danish-German nobleman. He was the eldest son of Duke Adolf of Holstein-Gottorp and his wife, Christine of Hesse (1543-1604).

He inherited the ducal share of rule in the royal Danish-ducal condominium of the duchies of Holstein and of Schleswig when his father died in 1586, and died only a year later.

Ancestors 

Dukes of Holstein-Gottorp
1568 births
1587 deaths
16th-century German people